Landsborough railway station is located on the North Coast line in Queensland, Australia. It serves the town of Landsborough in the Sunshine Coast Region.

History

In 1998, construction began on Platform 2.

In December 2006, the State Government announced the station would be upgraded. The work was completed in late 2007, and included the building of new platforms, rainwater tanks, shelters, lighting, and toilets. A new cark park was also built. These upgrades were part of an overhaul of the Caboolture to  Landsborough section of the North Coast line. The section was to be duplicated in full by 2012, but so far only the Caboolture to Beerburrum section has been completed. This is now scheduled to be completed by 2021.

On the eastern side of the station, a locomotive turning triangle remains in use, making Landsborough a popular destination for steam trains from Brisbane.

The station has the Landsborough Air Raid Shelter, one of the few remaining examples of World War II reinforced-concrete air raid shelters in Queensland. Landsborough was a regular stopping point for refreshments for troop trains. The air raid shelter is now heritage-listed.

Services
Landsborough is serviced by City network services to Brisbane, Nambour and Gympie North. To relieve congestion on the single track North Coast line, the rail service is supplemented by a bus service operated by Kangaroo Bus Lines on weekdays between Caboolture and Nambour as route 649.

Landsborough is also served by long-distance Traveltrain Electric Tilt Train services to Bundaberg and Rockhamption.

Services by platform

Transport links
Sunbus operate two routes to and from Landsborough station:
605: to Caloundra
615: to Sunshine Plaza via Mooloolaba, University of the Sunshine Coast

Glasshouse Country Coaches operates one route via Landsborough station:
891 Beerwah to Maleny, as it is a QConnect service, it is not part of the TransLink network and go card is not valid

References

External links

Landsborough station Queensland Rail
Landsborough station Queensland's Railways on the Internet

Landsborough, Queensland
North Coast railway line, Queensland
Railway stations in Sunshine Coast, Queensland
Queensland in World War II